The International Society of Explosives Engineers (ISEE) is a tax-exempt professional body founded in 1974 to advance the science and art of explosives engineering.. Headquartered in Cleveland, Ohio, it is the primary international organization for explosives engineers.

History
ISEE was founded in Pittsburgh in 1974, when a small group of explosives engineers came together to discuss how to advance the science and art of explosives engineering.  Since then the ISEE has grown to over 4000 members with 45 local chapters.

Publications
The ISEE has 2 primary peer reviewed publications, and an industry handbook.

Journals
 Journal of Explosives Engineering
 Blasting and Fragmentation Journal

Books
 Blasters' Handbook, 18th Edition

Conferences and education
Each year more than 1500 blasters, manufacturers, government officials and industry leaders, come together for an annual conference.  The Blasters Weekend is a preconference event targeted at field personnel focusing on more practical knowledge and skills.  The main conference is 3 days of technical papers and presentations.  Both conference events qualify for continuing education units (CEUs) and/or professional development hours (PDHs) for most states licensing programs.

Awards and designations
Industry awards and designations presented at the annual national conference.

 Blaster's Leadership Award
 Driller's Leadership Award
 Distinguished Service Award
 Paper of the Year
 President's Award

See also
Explosives Engineering

References

External links
 

Industrial organization
Explosives engineering